Berlanga may refer to:

People
 Carlos Berlanga (1959–2002), Spanish musician, composer and painter
 Consuelo Berlanga (born 1955), Spanish journalist
Edgar Berlanga (born 1997), American professional boxer
 Esteban Berlanga, Spanish ballet dancer
 Fray Tomás de Berlanga (1487–1551), fourth bishop of Panama, reportedly the first European to discover the Galápagos Islands
 Luis García Berlanga (1921–2010), Spanish film director and screenwriter

Places
Berlanga, Badajoz, a municipality in the province of Badajoz, Extremadura, Spain
Berlanga de Duero, a municipality located in the province of Soria, Castile and León, Spain
Berlanga del Bierzo, a municipality located in the province of León, Castile and León, Spain
San Baudelio de Berlanga, an early 11th-century church situated at Caltojar, province of Soria, Spain, 80 km south of Berlanga de Duero